Fishtrap was an unincorporated community located in Pike County, Kentucky, United States. Their Post Office  has been closed. The community was flooded during the creation of Fishtrap Lake.

References

Unincorporated communities in Pike County, Kentucky
Unincorporated communities in Kentucky